Vivès is a commune in the Pyrénées-Orientales department in southern France.

Geography 
Vivès is located in the canton of Vallespir-Albères and in the arrondissement of Céret.

Population and society

Demography

Education 
The school of Vivès had about 20 children in 1947 and only 8 in 1966, the year it was closed. Since then, the nearest school is in Saint-Jean-Pla-de-Corts.

Health 
The village of Vivès seems to have benefited, at least until the beginning of the twentieth century, from a local family of healers, renowned through the whole department of Pyrénées-Orientales.

There are no doctors nor any pharmacy in Vivès nowadays, the nearest being in Saint-Jean-Pla-de-Corts. The nearest clinic is in Céret and the nearest public hospital is in Perpignan.

See also
Communes of the Pyrénées-Orientales department

References

Communes of Pyrénées-Orientales